FC Avanhard Korukivka is a Ukrainian amateur football club based in Koriukivka, Chernihiv Oblast. Now the team is playing in the amateur championship of Ukraine.

History
The club was founded in 2006 in the Chernihiv Oblast. In 2007 he won lead by Valeriy Chornyi the Chernihiv Oblast Football Championship in 2007 in 2012, and in 2013. In 2011 the club won Chernihiv Oblast Football Cup and in 2013

Achievements
 Winners of the Chernihiv City Football Championship 2010
 The owner of the football cup in memory of EG Школьникова 2010
 Winners of the 2011 Futsal Cup
 Winners of the Epicenter of the Chernihiv City Beach Soccer Championship 2012
 Winners of the Chernihiv Regional Football Championship 2012
 Winner of the Chernihiv Futsal Cup 2012.
 Winner of the Super Cup of the region in 2012

Notable players
  Vitaliy Mentey
  Dmytro Borshch
  Maksym Chaus
  Valeriy Chornyi
  Pavlo Fedosov
  Oleksandr Kozhemyachenko
  Pavlo Dulzon
  Serhiy Datsenko

Managers 
 2015: Valeriy Sokolenko
 2015: Artem Padun
 2015-2020: Valeriy Chornyi

References

Football clubs in Chernihiv Oblast
Association football clubs established in 2008